Acacia jamesiana is a tree or shrub belonging to the genus Acacia and the subgenus Juliflorae that is endemic central parts of western Australia.

Description
The tree or shrub typically grows to a height of  that has silvery sericeous branchlets and resinous new shoots. Like most species of Acacia it has phyllodes rather than true leaves. The evergreen, ascending to suberect phyllodes are often linear-tetragonous in shape with a rhombic cross section. It blooms from May to November producing yellow flowers.

Distribution
It is native to an area in the Mid West, Wheatbelt and Goldfields regions of Western Australia. It has a scattered distribution with the bulk of the population found from around Yalgoo in the west to the Carnarvon Range in the north east to around Leinster in the east. Outlying populations are located in the Gibson and Great Victoria Deserts. It is often situated on sand dunes and plains growing in a variety of soil types usually as a part of tall open shrubland communities and it is often associated with spinifex.

See also
List of Acacia species

References

jamesiana
Acacias of Western Australia
Plants described in 1980
Taxa named by Bruce Maslin